is a comedy OVA series based on Eri Takenashi's Type-Moon gag manga, . It focuses on absurd situations happening to each characters of Fate/stay night, Melty Blood and Tsukihime. It is followed by a spiritual sequel known as Fate/Grand Carnival.

Plot

The Ahnenerbe is a pub temporarily appearing among parallel worlds. Once every ten years, an event called "The Carnival Moment" occurs, where tales from other dimensions and worlds cross paths, allowing characters from various tales to encounter each other. During this particular Carnival Moment, a multitude of characters from Type-Moon works meet, mainly from Fate/stay night and Tsukihime. They are subjected to a series of situations and parody not seen in their respective works.

Development
The series was developed in order to celebrate the tenth anniversary of TYPE-MOON. The third season included the 12-minute special anime "Fate/Prototype" OAV.

Media

Manga
Take-Moon was published by Comic Ichijinsha with two volumes published on June 25, 2004 and on August 9, 2006. A reprint of 1 volume was published on November 26, 2011 with print and kindle versions retailed.

Anime
The series is produced by Lerche, directed by Seiji Kishi, written by Makoto Uezu and composed by Yasuharu Takanashi. The January issue of Ichijinsha's Monthly Comic Rex magazine announced that Take-Moon would receive an anime adaptation.

It was released in seasons which each has four episodes. The first season was released on August 12, 2011, the second season on October 28, 2011 and the third season on December 31, 2011. An extra episode titled "Carnival Phantasm EX Season" was released together with the omnibus version of the Take-Moon manga on November 26, 2011. A Take Moon special edition was announced on October 10, 2011.

The first season was released in Japan on August 14, 2011 via Blu-Ray with a retail cost of 6,825 yen. while the 2nd season was released on October 28, 2011. A complete edition was announced on February 8, 2015 with a release on April 30, 2015 with a retail price of 8,000 Yen.

The opening theme song is "Super Affection" (すーぱー☆あふぇくしょん) by Minami Kuribayashi, Miyuki Hashimoto, Faylan, Aki Misato, Yozuca* and Rino and the ending theme song is "Fellows" by Masaaki Endoh.

List of episodes

References

External links
 Type-Moon's Official Homepage for Carnival Phantasm  
 

Comedy anime and manga
Crossover anime and manga
Fantasy anime and manga
Films with screenplays by Makoto Uezu
Ichijinsha manga
Lerche (studio)
Manga based on video games
Type-Moon